An election to Limerick City Council took place on 20 June 1985 as part of that year's Irish local elections. 17 councillors were elected from four electoral divisions by PR-STV voting for a six-year term of office.

Results by party

Results by Electoral Area

Limerick Ward 1

Limerick Ward 2

Limerick Ward 3

Limerick Ward 4

External links
Irishelectionliterature

1985 Irish local elections
1985